Hamish McArthur (born 6 March 2001) is an English professional rock climber and competition climber, specialising in bouldering and lead climbing events.

In September 2021, he finished third in his first appearance at the IFSC Climbing World Championships.

Early life 

McArthur grew up in York, North Yorkshire attending Park Grove Primary School and then Joseph Rowntree School. At the age of 11 he became the youngest member of the Great Britain junior climbing squad. When McArthur was 12 he won the under 14s category at the British Youth Climbing Series Finals in Edinburgh.

Competition career 

At junior level McArthur won gold medal at the IFSC Junior Boulder World Championship in Voronezh, beating his previous best result of silver at the 2019 IFSC Youth World Championships.

Rock climbing 

Hamish has made some notable ascents on outdoor rock climbing routes. In December 2019, he redpointed Jungle Speed , followed shortly after with A Muerte , both located in Siurana.
In March 2021, he flashed Bulbhaul , at Almscliffe Crag, one of the UK's hardest bouldering routes.

References

External links 

2001 births
Living people
People from Yorkshire
Sportspeople from Yorkshire
British rock climbers
IFSC Climbing World Championships medalists
21st-century English people